Helen Lane (1921 – August 29, 2004) was an American translator of Spanish, Portuguese, French and Italian language literary works into English. She translated works by numerous important authors including Jorge Amado, Augusto Roa Bastos, Marguerite Duras, Juan Goytisolo, Mario Vargas Llosa, Curzio Malaparte, Juan Carlos Onetti, Octavio Paz, Nélida Piñon, and Luisa Valenzuela. She was a recipient of the National Book Award.

Career

Lane began her career in the 1940s as a government translator in Los Angeles, before moving to New York City to work for publishers there. She became a freelance translator in 1970, and moved to the Dordogne in France. In addition to her books, she also provided subtitles for films by Jean-Luc Godard and Haskell Wexler.

She received the PEN Translation Prize in 1975 for her translation of Count Julian by Juan Goytisolo and in 1985 for her translation of The War at the End of the World by Mario Vargas Llosa.

Life
She was born Helen Ruth Overholt in Minneapolis and graduated summa cum laude in 1943 from the University of California, Los Angeles, where in 1953 she obtained a master's degree in Romance Languages and Romance Literatures. She continued her coursework at UCLA to the doctoral level. In 1954, Lane was awarded a Fulbright Fellowship to France. She studied at the Sorbonne for one year.

List of translations

Alternating Current, Lane's translation of Octavio Paz, won the 1974 U.S. National Book Award in the category Translation (a split award).

On Heroes and Tombs (Ernesto Sabato)
The Storyteller (Mario Vargas Llosa)
Count Julian (Juan Goytisolo)
A Fish in the Water (Mario Vargas Llosa)
Essays on Mexican Art
Caetana's Sweet Song
Massacre in Mexico (Elena Poniatowska)
The Three Marias: New Portuguese Letters
State of Siege
The Perón Novel
Santa Evita
The Memoirs of Fray Servando Teresa de Mier (Servando Teresa de Mier)
I, the Supreme (Augusto Roa Bastos)
Les choses: a story of the sixties (Georges Perec)
Aunt Julia and the Scriptwriter (Mario Vargas Llosa)
The War of the End of the World (Mario Vargas Llosa)
The Double Flame (Octavio Paz)
Machiavelli (Edmond Barincou)

References

Portuguese–English translators
Spanish–English translators
French–English translators
Italian–English translators
National Book Award winners
1921 births
2004 deaths
20th-century American translators
20th-century American women writers
American expatriates in France
21st-century American women